Dan Steele (born March 20, 1969) is an American bobsledder and track and field athlete who competed from the early 1990s to 2002. Competing in two Winter Olympics, he won the bronze medal in the four-man event at Salt Lake City in 2002. He was recently  one of the most successful collegiate track and field coaches in America.

Stroke: 
On July 28, 2017, Steele nearly died from a massive hemorrhagic stroke. He stepped away from coaching after the stroke. 
Steele spent 2.5 months in the hospital relearning how to walk and talk.

Athletic career

A native of Sherrard, Illinois, Steele graduated from Eastern Illinois University with a degree in sociology. During the 1990s, he also competed in athletics first in the 400 m hurdles (winning the 1992 NCAA title) and later in the decathlon, qualifying for the United States Olympic trials for the 1992, 1996, and 2000 Summer Olympics, earning his best finishes of fifth in the decathlon in the 2000 trials. Steele even finished eighth in the decathlon at the 1999 World Athletics Championships in Seville, Spain.

Steele also earned a silver medal at the 1999 pan Am Games.

Coaching career
In 1993, Steele moved from Illinois to Eugene, Oregon to train full-time in track and field. In 2001 he became a volunteer athletics coach for the University of Oregon. In between coaching stints, Steele competed in bobsleigh for the U.S. both in 1998 and 2002. At the 2002 Winter Olympics, he earned a bronze medal in the four-man event, a feat that ended a 46-year medal drought for the United States in that sport.

Retiring from bobsleigh after the 2002 Winter Olympics, Steele was formerly the Head Track and Field coach at the University of Northern Iowa. Prior to UNI, Steele was the Associate Head Coach at the University of Oregon. In 2009 Steele was named the National Men's Coach of the Year for helping lead the Oregon men to an NCAA Indoor title. Steele was also named the West Region Women's Coach of the Year in 2009 for helping lead the Oregon women to their first Pacific-10 title since 1992. That same year he coached Ashton Eaton to the NCAA Decathlon title and Brianne Theisen to the NCAA Heptathlon title. This marked first time in NCAA history both multis winners represented the same institution. The 2005 and 2007 NCAA West Regional Assistant Coach of the Year for Men’s Sprints and Hurdles and the 2008 Pac-10 Coach of the Year has established himself as one of the nation’s top coaches. Steele has guided athletes to eight individual NCAA titles, 24 conference titles, 31 All-America honors, 32 school records, five Pac-10 team titles, and one NCAA team title.

In 2015,  Dan Steele, whose exemplary resume includes experiences as an Olympic medalist, NCAA champion and head coach, was most recently Iowa State Cyclones’s Men’s & Women’s Associate Head Track & Field coach.

Achievements

Book:
In 2021, Steele published American Steele, a memoir chronicling his life as an athlete, coach, and stroke survivor.

References

 
 UNI Head Track and Field Coach
 Dan Steele UNI Track & Field Blog
 CNN Sports Illustrated profile of 2002 US bobsled team

1969 births
American male bobsledders
American male hurdlers
American male decathletes
Athletes (track and field) at the 1999 Pan American Games
Bobsledders at the 2002 Winter Olympics
Olympic bronze medalists for the United States in bobsleigh
Eastern Illinois University alumni
Living people
People from Moline, Illinois
Sportspeople from Eugene, Oregon
University of Oregon people
Medalists at the 2002 Winter Olympics
Pan American Games medalists in athletics (track and field)
Pan American Games silver medalists for the United States
Eastern Illinois Panthers men's track and field athletes
Medalists at the 1999 Pan American Games